North Dakota's 1st congressional district is an obsolete congressional district in the state of North Dakota that existed from 1913 to 1933, and from 1963 to 1973.

History
Prior to 1913, North Dakota elected two members of the United States House of Representatives at-large. Following the 1910 Census, reapportionment gave North Dakota another seat and beginning with the 1912 congressional elections, North Dakota divided its delegation into three districts.

Following the 1930 Census, North Dakota lost a seat and returned to electing two members at-large in 1933. In 1963, the state divided into two congressional districts. Following the 1970 redistricting cycle after the 1970 United States census, North Dakota lost another seat, and since 1973, has had only one member, elected at-large.

List of members representing the district

Election results

References

 Congressional Biographical Directory of the United States 1774–present

01
Former congressional districts of the United States
1913 establishments in North Dakota
1973 disestablishments in North Dakota
Constituencies established in 1913
Constituencies disestablished in 1973